Robert Lemelson is an American cultural anthropologist, ethnographic filmmaker and philanthropist. Lemelson received his M.A. from the University of Chicago and Ph.D. from the Department of Anthropology at the University of California, Los Angeles. Lemelson's area of specialty is transcultural psychiatry; Southeast Asian Studies, particularly Indonesia; and psychological and medical anthropology. He currently is a research anthropologist in the Semel Institute of Neuroscience UCLA, and an adjunct professor of Anthropology at UCLA. His scholarly work has appeared in numerous journals and books. Lemelson founded Elemental Productions in 2008, a documentary production company, and has directed and produced numerous ethnographic films. His blog Psychocultural Cinema contains numerous blog-posts and edited film works.

Lemelson also is involved in a number of philanthropic ventures. He is the president of The Foundation for Psychocultural Research, a research foundation that supports work integrating the social and neurosciences. He also acts a director for The Lemelson Foundation, a foundation started by his late father Jerome Lemelson to support inventors, invention and innovation in the United States and the developing world. Lemelson has also funded a number of programs supporting scholarship and research in Anthropology through the Robert Lemelson Foundation, which is a separate foundation from The Lemelson Foundation. These include Lemelson Anthropological Scholars program at UCLA, and the Lemelson-SPA conference fund and the Lemelson-SPA student fellows program administered by the Society for Psychological Anthropology. In addition, he helped create and fund the first program on Indonesian studies in thirty years, located in the International Institute at UCLA.

Filmography

Select Journal Articles

Select Book Chapters
 "Afflictions: Psychopathology and Recovery in a Cultural Context" by Lemelson, R., and Tucker, A., in  Kirmayer, L., Lemelson, R., and Cummings, C. eds. in Revisioning psychiatry: Cultural Phenomenology, Critical Neuroscience and Global Mental Health. 483-514. 2015.
 "Fear and Silence in Burma and Indonesia: Comparing Two National Tragedies and Two Individual Outcomes of Trauma" by Lemelson, R., Thein-Lemelson, S. in Ataria, Y., Gurevitz, D., Pedaya, H., and Neria, Y. eds. in Interdisciplinary Handbook of Trauma and Culture. 2016.
 "Anak PKI!: Multigenerational Trauma in a Javanese boy" by Lemelson, R., Ng, Emily and Supartini, N. in Worthman, C., Plotsky, P., Schecter, D. and Cummings C. Formative Experiences: The Interaction of Caregiving, Culture, and Developmental Psychobiology Cambridge: Cambridge University Press, 2010
 "Children and Post Traumatic Stress Disorder" by Lemelson, R. in Shweder, R. et al. Ed. Chicago Companion to the Child. Chicago: University of Chicago Press, 2009.
 "Neuropsychiatric Disorders and Traditional Healing in Indonesia: The Question of Efficacy" by Lemelson, R. in Maldonado, M. ed. Psychiatrists and Traditional Healers: Unwitting Partners in Global Mental Health. London, UK: John Wiley & Sons, 2008.
 "Trauma in Context: Integrating Biological, Clinical and Cultural Perspectives" by Lemelson, R., Kirmayer, L, Barad, M. in Kirmayer, L, Lemelson, R., Barad, M. eds. Understanding Trauma: Integrating Cultural, Psychological and Biological Perspectives. Cambridge: Cambridge University Press, 2007.
 "Epilogue: Trauma and the Vicissitudes of Interdisciplinary Integration" by Kirmayer, L, Lemelson, R., Barad, M. in Kirmayer, L, Lemelson, R., Barad, M. eds. Understanding Trauma: Integrating Cultural, Psychological and Biological Perspectives. Cambridge: Cambridge University, 2007

Edited Volumes

 "Understanding Trauma: Integrating Cultural, Psychological and Biological Perspectives". Kirmayer, L, Lemelson, R., Barad, M. eds. Cambridge: Cambridge University Press, 2007.
 "Re-Visioning Psychiatry: Cultural Phenomenology, Critical Neuroscience and Global Mental Health ". Kirmayer, L, Lemelson, R., Cummings,C. eds. Cambridge: Cambridge University Press, 2015.

Books

"Afflictions: Steps Toward A Visual Psychological Anthropology". Lemelson,, R. Tucker, A. New York: Palgrave Macmillan. 2017.

Multi-Media

Shadows and Illuminations: A Multi-touch Film Guide || E-book || 2015 || Shadows and Illuminations: A Multi-touch Film Guide is a multimedia eBook study guide and documentary film available on the iTunes platform. The book integrates the complete film Shadows and Illuminations as well as a film guide that explores historical, clinical, cinematic and cultural material at the intersection of medical, visual and psychological anthropology.

Select articles
New York Times review of "Bitter Honey" 
Inside Indonesia film Review of "Bitter Honey"
Somatosphere article "The Afflictions Series: An interview with ethnographic Filmmaker Robert Lemelson"
Neuroanthropology analysis of Tourette's Syndrome and "The Bird Dancer"
UCLA Today-10 Questions for Robert Lemelson
The Harvard Crimson, "Breaking from the 'Silence'"
Jakarta Globe, "Breaking the 40-Year Silence About the Anti-Communist Purge"
Voice of America Interview with Director Robert Lemelson
Jakarta Globe, "1965 Mass Killings Erased From History, Scholars Say"
Jakarta Globe, "1965: Giving Voice to the Silenced Past"
 "Strange Maladies". Lemelson, R. December 2001 Psychology Today

References

External links
 
 40 Years of Silence: An Indonesian Tragedy (Official Website)
 Afflictions: Culture & Mental Illness in Indonesia Film Series (Official Website) 
 Jathilan: Trance and Possession in Java (Official Website)
 Documentary Educational Resources (Educational Distributor's Website)
 UCLA Department of Anthropology faculty page
 The Foundation for Psychocultural Research
 / Kanopy Streaming site

Visual anthropologists
American documentary filmmakers
American philanthropists
Psychological anthropologists
American anthropologists
University of Chicago alumni
University of California, Los Angeles alumni
Living people
Year of birth missing (living people)